The JSB World (styled THE JSB WORLD) is a greatest hits album by Japanese pop boy-band Sandaime J Soul Brothers. It was released on March 29, 2017. It was number-one on the Oricon Weekly Albums Chart on its release, selling 356,772 copies. It was also number-one on the Billboard Japan Weekly Top Albums Sales Chart. By the end of 2017 the album had sold a total of 467,005 copies.

Track listing

Charts

References

2016 greatest hits albums
Japanese-language albums